Slettmarkkampen is a mountain in Vang Municipality in Innlandet county, Norway. The mountain is surrounded by several other notable mountains including Slettmarkpiggen to the east, Galdeberget to the southwest, Snøholstinden to the northwest, and Store Svartdalspiggen to the northeast.

See also
List of mountains of Norway by height

References

Vang, Innlandet
Mountains of Innlandet